William of Soissons; French: Guillaume de Soissons; was a French logician who lived in Paris in the 12th century. He belonged to a school of logicians, called the Parvipontians.

William of Soissons fundamental logical problem and solution 

William of Soissons seems to have been the first one to answer the question, "Why is a contradiction not accepted in logic reasoning?" by the Principle of explosion. Exposing a contradiction was already in the ancient days of Plato a way of showing that some reasoning was wrong, but there was no explicit argument as to why contradictions were incorrect. William of Soissons gave a proof in which he showed that from a contradiction any assertion can be inferred as true. In example from:  It is raining (P) and  it is not raining (¬P)   you may infer   that there are trees on the moon (or whatever else)(E). In symbolic language: P & ¬P → E.

If a contradiction makes anything true then it makes it impossible to say anything meaningful: whatever you say, its contradiction is also true.

C. I. Lewis's reconstruction of his proof 

William's contemporaries compared his proof with a siege engine (12th century). Clarence Irving Lewis formalized this proof as follows:

Proof

V    : or
&    : and
→    : inference
P    : proposition
¬ P  : denial of P
P &¬ P : contradiction.
E      : any possible assertion (Explosion).

 (1) P &¬ P → P         (If P and ¬ P are both true then P is true)
 (2) P → P∨E            (If P is true then P or E is true)
 (3) P &¬ P → P∨E       (If P and ¬ P are both true then P or E are true (from (2))
 (4) P &¬ P → ¬P        (If P and ¬ P are both true then ¬P is true)
 (5) P &¬ P → (P∨E) &¬P (If P and ¬ P are both true then (P∨E) is true (from (3)) and ¬P is true (from (4)))
 (6) (P∨E) &¬P → E      (If (P∨E) is true and ¬P is true then E is true)
 (7) P &¬ P → E         (From (5) and (6) one after the other follows (7))

Acceptance and criticism in later ages 

In the 15th century this proof was rejected by a school in Cologne. They didn't accept step (6). In 19th-century classical logic, the Principle of Explosion was widely accepted as self-evident, e.g. by logicians like George Boole and Gottlob Frege, though the formalization of the Soissons proof by Lewis provided additional grounding for the Principle of Explosion.

References 

Logicians
Theorems in propositional logic